Three ships of the Royal Navy have borne the name HMS Gladiator, after the Gladiators of the ancient Roman Empire:

  was a fifth-rate ship of the line launched in 1783.  She spent her entire career on harbour service, never once putting to sea.  She was broken up in 1817.
  was a wood paddle frigate launched in 1844 and broken up in 1879.
  was an  second class protected cruiser, launched in 1896 and sunk on 25 April 1908 in a collision off the Isle of Wight.

References

Royal Navy ship names